Bernardakis  or Μπερναρδάκης) is a Greek surname. It is transliterated Bernardakes, but depending on the original Greek spelling, it sometimes transcribes as Vernardakis given the phonetic values of Modern Greek; nevertheless, given the prominence of many of its bearers outside Greece as well as within, before and after the development of more modern transcription systems, it is often Latinised using a hybrid system. At least one bearer of the name has it spelled in Greek with both the Β and Μπ variants, which can give two different orthographic transcriptions regardless of the system used. Notable bearers of the surname include:

Christophoros Vernardakis, Greek political scientist, Alternate Minister of Administrative Reform in the Second Cabinet of Alexis Tsipras
Demetrios Bernardakis, Greek playwright, brother of Gregorios
Dimitrios Bernardakis (Vernardakis), Greek merchant and philanthropist; benefactor of the National and Kapodistrian University of Athens
Gregorios Bernardakis (1848-1925), classical philologist, brother of Demetrios
Demetrios Bernardakis (philologist), classical philologist, son of Gregorios
Panagiotis Bernardakis, classical philologist; son of Demetrios (philologist), grandson of Gregorios

Greek-language surnames
Surnames